This article lists the colonial governors of Italian Eritrea from 1890 to 1941. They administered the territory on behalf of the Kingdom of Italy.

List
Before the official creation of Italian Eritrea (Colonia Eritrea) in 1890, the territory had seven interim governors: Giovanni Branchi (1882 to 1885), Alessandro Caimi (1885), Tancredi Saletta (1885), Carlo Genè (1886 to 1887), Tancredi Saletta (1887), Alessandro Di San Marzano (1888) and Antonio Baldissera (1889).

Complete list of Italian Governors of Eritrea:

From 1936, the colony of Eritrea was increased in size and called Eritrea Governorate, as part of Africa Orientale Italiana (AOI). The Italian governors were under direct orders of the Viceroy (representing the now-King and Emperor Victor Emmanuel III).

Notes

See also
Eritrea
Politics of Eritrea
List of heads of state of Eritrea
Italian Eritrea
Eritrea Governorate
Lists of office-holders

References

Bibliography
Killion, Tom. Historical Dictionary of Eritrea. The Scarecrow Press. .

Eritrea
Italian Governors of Eritrea
Italian Eritrea, Colonial governors
Italian Eritrea
Italian Empire-related lists